The PPP Long March was an anti-government ongoing long march led by Pakistan Peoples Party's Chairman Bilawal Bhutto Zardari. The march started from Mazar-e-Quaid in Karachi on Sunday, 27 February 2022 at 10 AM. The march will reach Islamabad in 10 days from Karachi via 34 different cities.

March route and Timeline
Bilawal Bhutto Zardari had approved the route plan of the march and this march will reach Islamabad in 10 days from Karachi through 34 different cities.

1st Day/27 Feb – The march led by Bilawal Bhutto Zardari will start from Mazar-e-Quaid in Karachi at 10 am and will reach Badin via Thatta and Sujawal where the first day will end.
2nd Day/28 Feb – The second day of March will end at Moro via Hyderabad, Halla, Nawabshah.
3rd Day/1 Mar – The march will reach Khairpur city from Moro where the third day will end in Sukkur.
4th Day/2 Mar – The long march will start from Sukkur and will reach Rahim Yar Khan via Ghotki.
5th Day/3 Mar – It will start from Rahim Yar Khan and end at Multan via Bahawalpur, Lodhran.
6th Day/4 Mar – It will reach Sahiwal from Multan via Khanewal and Chichawatni.
7th Day/5 Mar – It will enter Lahore from Sahiwal via Okara and Pattoki.
8th Day/6 Mar – Depart from Nasir Bagh Lahore and reach Sheeranwala Bagh Gujranwala and Will stay in Wazirabad.
9th Day/7 Mar – They will leave Lala Musa for Rawalpindi and end at Rawalpindi Liaquat Bagh.
10th Day/8 Mar – The long march will leave for its destination where it will start from Rawalpindi and the public convoy will reach the federal capital Islamabad via various routes.

See also
 Huqooq-e-Sindh March

References

2022 in Pakistan
Protests in Pakistan
February 2022 events in Pakistan
March 2022 events in Pakistan
Protest marches
Pakistan People's Party
2022 in Pakistani politics
Politics of Pakistan